Everybody Knows is the sixth studio album by American country music artist Trisha Yearwood, containing country pop-styled ballads.

The album reached #6 on the Billboard country albums chart. The album produced the fourth Billboard country Number One hit of her career in "Believe Me Baby (I Lied)", as well as a #3 in its title track, and a #36 in "I Need You".The album was also nominated for the CMA Album of the Year award.

Track listing
"I Want to Live Again" (Tom Shapiro, George Teren) – 3:05
"It's Alright" (Gary Nicholson, Jamie O'Hara) – 3:13
"Believe Me Baby (I Lied)" (Larry Gottlieb, Kim Richey, Angelo Petraglia) – 3:42
"I Need You" (Jess Brown, Wendell Mobley) – 3:42
"Little Hercules" (Craig Carothers) – 4:49
"Under the Rainbow" (Matraca Berg, Randy Scruggs) – 4:15
"Everybody Knows" (Berg, Gary Harrison) – 3:14
"Hello, I'm Gone" (Kevin Welch) – 3:42
"Maybe It's Love" (Beth Nielsen Chapman, Annie Roboff) – 5:01
"A Lover Is Forever" (Steve Goodman, J. Fred Knobloch) – 3:44

International edition
"I Want to Live Again" (Tom Shapiro, George Teren) – 3:05
"It's Alright" (Gary Nicholson, Jamie O'Hara) – 3:13
"Even A Cowboy Can Dream" (Craig Bickhardt, Barry Alfonso) - 4:06
"Believe Me Baby (I Lied)" (Larry Gottlieb, Kim Richey, Angelo Petraglia) – 3:42
"I Need You" (Jess Brown, Wendell Mobley) – 3:42
"Little Hercules" (Craig Carothers) – 4:49
"Under the Rainbow" (Matraca Berg, Randy Scruggs) – 4:15
"Everybody Knows" (Berg, Gary Harrison) – 3:14
"Hello, I'm Gone" (Kevin Welch) – 3:42
"Find a River" (Fred Tackett) – 3:31
"The Chance I Take" (Tom Littfield, Rick Rowell) – 3:31
"Maybe It's Love" (Beth Nielsen Chapman, Annie Roboff) – 5:01
"A Lover Is Forever" (Steve Goodman, J. Fred Knobloch) – 3:44

Personnel 
 Trisha Yearwood – lead vocals, harmony vocals (1, 3, 5)
 Matt Rollings – organ (1, 3), acoustic piano (2, 4-9)
 Steve Nathan – organ (2, 6), keyboards (4, 8, 9)
 Fats Kaplin – accordion (8)
 Billy Joe Walker, Jr. – acoustic guitar (1-9)
 Biff Watson – acoustic guitar (1, 3)
 Bobby All – acoustic guitar (2, 7)
 Steuart Smith – acoustic guitar (5)
 J. Fred Knobloch – acoustic guitar (10)
 Brent Mason – electric guitars (1-4, 6-9), gut string guitar (9)
 Dan Dugmore – steel guitar (1, 4), 12-string guitar (3)
 Paul Franklin – steel guitar (2, 5-9), Hawaiian guitar (6)
 Leland Sklar – bass (1, 3, 4)
 Dave Pomeroy – bass (2, 5-9)
 Eddie Bayers – drums (1-8)
 Owen Hale – drums (9)
 Tom Roady – tambourine (1, 3)
 Sam Bacco – claves (2), marimba (2), shakers (2), cymbals (5), dumbek (5), congas (7)
 Rob Hajacos – fiddle (1, 2, 6, 8)
 Aubrey Haynie – fiddle (7)
 Kirk "Jelly Roll" Johnson – harmonica (10)
 Garth Fundis – harmony vocals (1, 8)
 Cindy Richardson – harmony vocals (1)
 Dennis Wilson – harmony vocals (1)
 Raul Malo – harmony vocals (2)
 Kim Richey – harmony vocals (3)
 Andrea Zonn – harmony vocals (4, 7)
 Matraca Berg – harmony vocals (6, 7)
 Harry Stinson – harmony vocals (6, 7)
 Mac McAnally – harmony vocals (7)
 Becky Priest – harmony vocals (8)
 Vince Gill – harmony vocals (9)

The Nashville String Machine (Tracks 4, 5 & 9)
 Charles Cochran – string arrangements (4)
 Kristin Wilkinson – string arrangements (5, 9)
 John Catchings – cello
 Richard Grosjean, Gary Vanosdale and Kristin Wilkinson – viola
 David Angell, David Davidson, Connie Ellisor, Carl Gorodetzky, Lee Larrison, Pamela Sixfin, Alan Umstead and Mary Kathryn Vanosdale – violin

String Trio (Track 10)
 John Catchings – cello
 Kristin Wilkinson – viola, arrangements 
 David Davidson – violin

Production 
 Garth Fundis – producer
 Chuck Ainlay – recording, mixing 
 Dave Sinko – recording 
 Ken Hutton – additional recording, recording assistant
 Carl Meadows – recording assistant
 Mark Ralston – recording assistant, mix assistant
 Alan Schulman – recording assistant
 Graham Lewis – mix assistant
 Don Cobb – digital editing 
 Carlos Grier – digital editing
 Denny Purcell – mastering
 Georgetown Masters (Nashville, Tennessee) – mastering location 
 Scott Paschall – production assistant 
 Beth Middleworth – art direction, design
 Trisha Yearwood – art direction
 Russ Harrington – photography
 Norma Jean Roy – booklet photography
 Mary Beth Felts – make-up
 Sheri McCoy – stylist
 Maria Smoot – hair stylist
 Karen & Co. – management

Charts

Weekly charts

Year-end charts

Singles

Certifications

References

1996 albums
Trisha Yearwood albums
MCA Records albums
Albums produced by Garth Fundis